Markleeville (formerly, Markleville) is a census-designated place (CDP) and the county seat of Alpine County, California, United States.  The population was 191 at the 2020 census, down from 210 at the 2010 census.

History

Jacob J. Marklee founded a toll bridge crossing the Carson River in 1861. He aimed to tap into the traffic from the silver mining boom at Silver Mountain City. On June 23, 1862, he recorded a land claim of 160 acres in Douglas County, Nevada. A boundary survey took place, and the property ended up being in California. In 1863, Marklee died after being involved in a gunfight. When the Comstock Lode discovery took place, the town of Markleeville was founded on the Marklee property. Today, the Alpine County Courthouse sits on the former property, which is listed as a California Historical Landmark.

A post office opened in Markleeville in 1863.

Geography
The region comprising Markleeville is Alpine in appearance, with lush grassy valley areas. There is a hot spring, and a state park with a campground. Excellent hiking trails abound.

Climate
According to the Köppen Climate Classification system, Markleeville has a warm-summer Mediterranean climate, abbreviated Csb on climate maps, though it approaches a Humid continental climate (Dsb).

Markleeville has warm to hot summers with only occasional rainfall, mostly from afternoon and evening thunderstorms; nights are usually well below . Winters are somewhat cold and often snowy.

There are an average of 59 days with measurable precipitation.

Demographics

2010
At the 2010 census Markleeville had a population of 210. The racial makeup of Markleeville was 192 (91%) White, 0 (0%) African American, 4 (2%) Native American, 2 (1%) Asian, 0 (0%) Pacific Islander, 6 (3%) from other races, and 6 (3%) from two or more races. Hispanic or Latino of any race were 11 people (5%).

The whole population lived in households; no one lived in non-institutionalized group quarters and no one was institutionalized.

There were 100 households, 19 (19%) had children under the age of 18 living in them, 47 (47%) were opposite-sex married couples living together, 5 (5%) had a female householder with no husband present, 5 (5%) had a male householder with no wife present.  There were 9 (9%) unmarried opposite-sex partnerships, and 1 (1%) same-sex married couples or partnerships. 32 households (32%) were one person and 8 (8%) had someone living alone who was 65 or older. The average household size was 2.1.  There were 57 families (57% of households); the average family size was 2.7.

The population was spread out, with 39 people (19%) under the age of 18, 3 people (1%) aged 18 to 24, 42 people (20%) aged 25 to 44, 92 people (44%) aged 45 to 64, and 34 people (16%) who were 65 or older.  The median age was 50.8 years. For every 100 females, there were 101.9 males.  For every 100 females age 18 and over, there were 101.2 males.

The homeowner vacancy rate was 2%; the rental vacancy rate was 10%.  133 people (63% of the population) lived in owner-occupied housing units and 77 people (37%) lived in rental housing units.

2000
At the 2000 census there were 197 people, 92 households, and 57 families in the CDP.  The population density was 10.3 people per square mile (4.0/km2).  There were 173 housing units at an average density of 9.1 per square mile (3.5/km2).  The racial makeup of the CDP was 98% White, 2% Native American, 1% from other races. 2% were Hispanic or Latino of any race.

Of the 92 households, 21% had children under the age of 18 living with them, 51% were married couples living together, 8% had a female householder with no husband present, and 38% were non-families. 30% of households were one person, and 9% were one person aged 65 or older.  The average household size was 2.1 and the average family size was 2.6.

The age distribution was 17% under the age of 18, 4% from 18 to 24, 31% from 25 to 44, 34% from 45 to 64, and 15% 65 or older.  The median age was 45 years. For every 100 females, there were 95.0 males.  For every 100 females age 18 and over, there were 101.2 males.

The median household income was $46,563 and the median family income was $63,750. Males had a median income of $49,375 versus $25,972 for females. The per capita income for the CDP was $40,774.  About 7% of families and 15% of the population were below the poverty line, including 25% of those under the age of eighteen and 13% of those 65 or over.

Arts and culture
Markleeville hosts an annual bicycle ride called the Death Ride - Tour of the California Alps.  The route goes over five passes for a total distance of 129 miles and over 15,000 feet of elevation gain.  In 2010 3,500 riders participated and 2,417 completed the full course of 5 mountain passes.

References

Census-designated places in Alpine County, California
County seats in California
California Historical Landmarks
Populated places in the Sierra Nevada (United States)
Census-designated places in California
1861 establishments in California
Populated places established in 1861